Alfredo Antonio Figueroa Ahumada (born 27 October 1978) is a Chilean footballer that previously plays for PSM Makassar in the Indonesia Super League.

Career
In his homeland, Figueroa played for Everton and Deportes Melipilla.

In 2003 he moved to Indonesia and joined Persebaya Surabaya. He also played for Persekabpas Pasuruan, PSIS Semarang, Mitra Kukar, Persitara North Jakarta and PSM Makassar.

References

External links

1978 births
Living people
People from San Felipe de Aconcagua Province
Chilean footballers
Chilean expatriate footballers
Everton de Viña del Mar footballers
Deportes Melipilla footballers
Persebaya Surabaya players
Persekabpas Pasuruan players
PSIS Semarang players
Mitra Kukar players
Persitara Jakarta Utara players
PSM Makassar players
Chilean Primera División players
Primera B de Chile players
Liga 1 (Indonesia) players
Indonesian Premier Division players
Association football forwards
Chilean expatriate sportspeople in Indonesia
Expatriate footballers in Indonesia